Vladica Babić and Caitlin Whoriskey were the defending champions but chose not to participate.

Nao Hibino and Sabrina Santamaria won the title, defeating Sophie Chang and Katarzyna Kawa in the final, 6–4, 7–6(7–4).

Seeds

Draw

Draw

References

External Links
Main Draw

Central Coast Pro Tennis Open - Doubles